Nguyễn Quang Minh (born 16 December 1982) is a former Vietnamese badminton player who later played for the United States. He was part of the national team that won the bronze medal at the 2005 Southeast Asian Games. He reached a career high of world number 100 in the men's singles and number 57 in the men's doubles partnered with Trần Thanh Hải. He represented his country at the 2006 Asian Games. Played for the Ho Chi Minh City team, he won the men's doubles title at the 2007 Vietnamese National Championships with Nguyễn Tiến Minh.

Nguyễn left the national team in 2008, and immigrated to the United States. In the US, he won the Dave Freeman Open in 2010 and 2011, also at the Boston Open in 2010, 2011 and 2012.

References

External links 
 

1982 births
Living people
Sportspeople from Ho Chi Minh City
Vietnamese male badminton players
Badminton players at the 2006 Asian Games
Asian Games competitors for Vietnam
Competitors at the 2001 Southeast Asian Games
Competitors at the 2003 Southeast Asian Games
Competitors at the 2005 Southeast Asian Games
Competitors at the 2007 Southeast Asian Games
Southeast Asian Games bronze medalists for Vietnam
Southeast Asian Games medalists in badminton
Vietnamese emigrants to the United States
American sportspeople of Vietnamese descent
American male badminton players